Modern Country is an album by jazz trombonist and arranger Kai Winding featuring jazz adaptations of country music songs recorded with members of The Nashville A-Team in 1964 for the Verve label.

Reception

The Allmusic site awarded the album 3 stars.

Track listing
 "I Really Don't Want to Know" (Don Robertson, Howard Barnes) - 3:05
 "Busted" (Harlan Howard) - 3:15
 "Wolverton Mountain" (Merle Kilgore, Claude King) - 2:19
 "Bye Bye, Love" (Felice Bryant, Bouleux Bryant) - 2:19
 "Cool Water" (Bob Nolan) - 2:52
 "Wildwood Flower" (Cecil Null) - 2:04
 "Detroit City" (Danny Dill, Mel Tillis) - 2:20
 "I Walk the Line" (Johnny Cash) - 2:04
 "Oh Lonesome Me" (Don Gibson) - 2:02
 "Slippin' Around" (Floyd Tillman) - 2:46
 "Gotta Travel On" (David Lazar, Larry Ehrlich, Paul Clayton, Tom Six) - 2:10
 "Dang Me" (Roger Miller) - 1:57
Recorded in Nashville, TN on August 5, 1964 (tracks 1–4) and August 6, 1964 (tracks 5–12)

Personnel 
Kai Winding - trombone, arranger, conductor
Gene Mullins, Bill Watrous - trombone
Harold Bradley, Ray Edenton, Grady Martin, Wayne Moss - guitar
Joe Zinkan - bass
Murrey Harman, Doug Kirkham- drums
The Anita Kerr Singers - vocal group (tracks 1, 4, 5 & 7–11)
Orchestra conducted by Grady Martin
Bill McElhiney - arranger, conductor

References 

1964 albums
Verve Records albums
Kai Winding albums
Albums produced by Creed Taylor